Eddie Murphy is a pilates coach and former player from County Cork. He played with Bishopstown before joining Kerry side Kerins O Rahillys and later Austin Stacks. He won an All Ireland B medal with Kerry in 1986. He also played minor football and hurling with Cork. He is now one of the leading Hurling Coaches in Ireland, having trained Kerry at all levels plus a number of clubs sides in both Kerry and Cork. He is a son of the Cork great Willie 'Long Puck' Murphy.

References
http://www.kerrygaa.ie/index.php?option=com_content&view=article&id=1610:the-1986-all-ireland-b-hurling-cship-team&catid=1&Itemid=74

Bishopstown hurlers
Kerry inter-county hurlers
Austin Stacks hurlers
Kerins O'Rahilly's hurlers
Place of birth missing (living people)
Hurling managers
Living people
Year of birth missing (living people)